Southwick is a town in Hampden County, Massachusetts, United States. The population was 9,232 at the 2020 census, down from 9,502 at the 2010 census. It is part of the Springfield, Massachusetts Metropolitan Statistical Area.

History 

Southwick was originally inhabited by either the Matitacooke, Mayawaug or Woronoake Native American tribes.

Early history

In the mid-17th century, pioneering English explorers moving up the Connecticut River Valley in search of fertile farmlands and game discovered the area and settled Southwick. It became a farming community, defined as the Southern (South-) village (-wick) part of the town of Westfield, Massachusetts. Early on, it was nicknamed "Poverty Plains" because the land was thought to be infertile. Its first residential home was built by Samuel Fowler and his wife Naomi Noble on what is now College Highway (US 202 and MA 10), about a quarter-mile north of the current town center.

In colonial times, church attendance was mandatory. The 800 Christian residents of Southwick in the 1760–1770s were required to travel to Westfield to congregate. Only by establishing their own church community could they establish their own parish, as they desired. On November 7, 1770, Southwick was incorporated as a separate district of Westfield. The area of Southwick became somewhat smaller in 1770. The southernmost portion of Southwick joined Suffield, Connecticut, as the result of a simultaneous secession of citizens in that part of the village.

Independence

Southwick became a fully independent town in 1770. The town remained divided until 1793, when Massachusetts claimed the area (known as the "jog"). A border dispute continued until 1804, when the current boundary was established through a compromise between Connecticut and Massachusetts. As a result of this border resolution, Southwick is the southernmost town in western Massachusetts.

Early 1800s

In the early 19th century, the Farmington Canal and the Hampshire and Hampden Canal were built to link New Haven, Connecticut, to Northampton, Massachusetts, through Southwick. Irish immigrants came to the area to labor on this project. Developers spoke of Southwick's potential, calling it the "Port of the World". Farmers worried that the canal would drain the area's lakes. It was reported that citizens would kick in the banks to damage the canal. Traces of the canal can still be found in the Great Brook and Congamond Lakes area. Due to winter freezing, summer drought and wildlife impact (beaver dams, etc.), the canal was phased out in favor of the railroad. Laflin-Phelps Homestead was built soon after the area was settled and remains the oldest standing structure in Southwick.

Completed in the late 1840s, the New Haven and Northampton Company's railroad was built alongside the canal (more or less) as a revolutionary mode of travel to and through Southwick. With the railroad came the ice industry and the tourist resorts around the Congamond Lakes (which were named Wenekeiamaug by the previous Native peoples). Several ornate hotels and dance halls were built, as well as a small amusement park. During the Industrial Era, summer vacationers and day-trippers would escape the hot and dirty cities connected by the Northeast Railroad Corridor, including New York City, Albany, Boston, Worcester, Hartford and especially Springfield. There was a special stop near the lakes where visitors would disembark to swim and/or pile into canopied pleasure boats.

During WWI and WWII, trains loaded with soldiers would pass through town. It has been noted that local girls would gather letters thrown by the soldiers from the train—and forward them to the intended recipients at the post office. The last train to pass along these tracks was around 1976. As of 2022, the old railway has been converted into a rail trail leading to Granby, Connecticut, known as the Farmington Canal Rail Trail.

All of Southwick's grand hotels and ornate train stations have since been torn down. Babb's Roller Skating Rink (on the Suffield side of Congamond Lakes) is all that remains of the amusement park.

Industry

Tobacco farming 
The farmland of Southwick is well-suited to grow tobacco, which is widely grown as a cash crop.

Ice harvesting
Ice collected from the Congamond Lakes was once stored in large ice houses in blocks and delivered via railway for food storage from New York City to Boston before electric refrigerators were widely available.

Geography

Southwick is the southernmost town in western Massachusetts, as a result of the "jog" in the Massachusetts-Connecticut border (see History of Massachusetts: Connecticut border). Southwick is bordered on the north by Westfield, on the east by Agawam, Massachusetts, and Suffield, Connecticut, on the south by Suffield and Granby, Connecticut, and on the west by Granby and by Granville, Massachusetts.

U.S. Route 202 (College Highway) crosses the town, leading north from the town center  to Westfield and south  to Granby, Connecticut. Massachusetts Route 57 crosses Southwick east to west, leading east  to downtown Springfield and west into the Berkshires.

The  Metacomet-Monadnock Trail (a hiking trail) passes through wetlands near Harts Pond before ascending over Provin Mountain, a trap rock ridge and cliffline that forms the eastern border of Southwick. Provin Mountain is part of the Metacomet Ridge, a mountainous trap rock ridgeline that stretches from Long Island Sound to near the Vermont border.

Demographics

As of the census of 2000, there were 8,835 people, 3,318 households, and 2,418 families residing in the town. The racial makeup of the town was 97.41% White, 0.51% African American, 0.20% Native American, 0.37% Asian, 0.01% Pacific Islander, 0.34% from other races, and 1.15% from two or more races. Hispanic or Latino of any race were 1.72% of the population.

There were 3,318 households, out of which 36.6% had children under the age of 18 living with them, 60.0% were married couples living together, 8.3% had a female householder with no husband present, and 27.1% were non-families. Of all households, 21.9% were made up of individuals, and 9.9% had someone living alone who was 65 years of age or older.  The average household size was 2.66 and the average family size was 3.13.

In the town, the population was spread out, with 26.5% under the age of 18, 6.3% from 18 to 24, 32.2% from 25 to 44, 23.2% from 45 to 64, and 11.7% who were 65 years of age or older.  The median age was 38 years. For every 100 females, there were 100.4 males.  For every 100 females age 18 and over, there were 98.2 males.

The median income for a household in the town was $52,296, and the median income for a family was $64,456. Males had a median income of $41,863 versus $30,889 for females. The per capita income for the town was $21,756.  About 3.8% of families and 6.1% of the population were below the poverty line, including 6.3% of those under age 18 and 9.8% of those age 65 or over.

Education
Southwick is part of the Southwick Regional School District, along with Granville, and Tolland. Students attend Woodland School from grades K to 2, and Powder Mill School from grades 3 to 6. High school students attend Southwick Regional School from grades 7 to 12. A vote in May 2012 in Southwick approved a $62M school renovation and construction project that was completed in 2015.

Media

TV media
 NBC: WWLP
 CBS: WSHM-LD
 ABC: WGGB

Newspaper media
 The Republican (daily)
 The Westfield News (daily)
 Saturday News (Saturday)

Government

Board of Selectmen (Select Board) 
 Russell Fox, Chairman
 Doug Moglan, Vice Chairman
 Jason Perron, Clerk

Library

The Southwick Free Public Library was established in 1892. In fiscal year 2008, the town of Southwick spent 2.03% ($316,544) of its budget on its public library—approximately $33 per person, per year ($43.49 adjusted for inflation to 2022).

Notable people
 Amasa Holcomb, (1787-1875) first telescope fabricator and manufacturer in the United States
 Matthew Laflin, (1803–1897) American businessman, philanthropist, and a founder of Chicago
 Rebecca Lobo, television basketball analyst and former player in the professional Women's National Basketball Association (WNBA)
 Jerri Nielsen, physician who self-treated her breast cancer while stationed at Amundsen–Scott South Pole Station in Antarctica

References

External links

 Town of Southwick official website
 MHC Survey Reconnaissance Town Report: Southwick, Massachusetts Historical Commission, 1982
 The Southwick Jog: Take Back the Notch! – a tongue-in-cheek write-up of this Connecticut–Massachusetts border curiosity

 
Border irregularities of the United States
Springfield metropolitan area, Massachusetts
Towns in Hampden County, Massachusetts
Towns in Massachusetts